The United States census of 1870 was the ninth United States census. It was conducted by the Census Bureau from June 1, 1870, to August 23, 1871. The 1870 census was the first census to provide detailed information on the African American population, only five years after the culmination of the Civil War when slaves were granted freedom.  The total population was 38,925,598 with a resident population of 38,558,371 individuals, a 22.6% increase from 1860. 

The 1870 census' population estimate was controversial, as many believed it underestimated the true population numbers, especially in New York and Pennsylvania. This was the first census in which all 100 largest cities recorded populations of over 10,000. This was also the last federal census conducted using the US Marshal Service as enumerators.

Census Act of 1850 
The Census Act of 1850 established the primary machinery of the ninth census. The Census Bureau, working within the Department of the Interior, oversaw the recording and tabulation of results gathered by assistant marshals, who were hired and supervised by Federal marshals. Two new structural changes during the 1870 census occurred: marshals had to return the completed population questionnaire to the Census Office in September and penalties for refusing to reply to enumerator questions were extended to encompass every question on the questionnaires.

Census organization 
The commonly past-used slave questionnaires were redesigned to reflect the American society after the Civil War. The five schedules for the 1870 census were the following: General Population, Mortality, Agriculture, Products of Industry, and Social Statistics.

The general population saw a 22.6% increase to 38,555,983 individuals in 1870. Charges of an undercount, however, were brought against Francis Amasa Walker, the Superintendent of the 1870 census.

Mortality rates in 1870, in general, decreased as a fraction of the total population by <0.1% from 1860 and by 0.1% from 1850.  The lower death rates indicate that the standard of living increased, due to some exogenous factor, over the period of twenty years from 1850 to 1870.

In terms of products of industry, total U.S. wealth increased by 17.3% from 1860 to 1870, to reach an assessed wealth of $14,178,986,732. The four largest state contributors to this wealth were New York, Massachusetts, Pennsylvania, and Ohio, in that order. Most of the wealth was concentrated in the developed Northeast region, as newer territories like Wyoming were beginning to develop their young economies.

The 1870 census was the first of its kind to record the nativity of the American population. This social statistic helped determine which areas were more highly composed of immigrants than native-born Americans. New York City had the most foreign-born individuals, with 419,094 foreigners, who comprised 44.5% of the city's total population. Philadelphia, Chicago, St. Louis, and San Francisco also had a great population of foreigners that made up a significant fraction of their total populations.  Therefore, a great ethnic and cultural change was witnessed from 1860 to 1870, as part of the population growth was due to immigrants moving in and a shuffling of residents across state borders.

Census results 

*The constitutional population excludes the populations of Native Americans "maintaining their tribal relations and living upon Government reservations" and "the newly acquired district of Alaska."

**When considering congressional apportionment, the total state population of the Constitutional population was used.

Census questions 
Schedule 1 of the 1870 census collected the following information

 Dwelling-houses numbered in the order of Visitation
 
 Families numbered in the order of visitation
 Names
 Age
 Sex
 Color
 Profession
 Value of Real Estate
 Value of Personal Estate
 Place of Birth (State, Territory, Country)
 Father's Birthplace*
 Mother's Birthplace*
 If born within the year, state month
 If married within the year, state month
 Attended School within the Year (Y/N)
 Cannot Read (Y/N)
 Cannot Write (Y/N)
 Deaf & dumb, blind, insane, idiotic, pauper, or convict
 Male Citizens of U.S. of 21 years of age or upwards
 Male Citizens of U.S of 21 years of age and upwards where rights to vote is denied on grounds other than rebellion or other crime**

*If born in another country

**This question asked if one's right to vote is being denied due to a legal matter other than rebellion or conviction. Such circumstances included being unable to pay poll taxes, or being unable to pass a literacy test.

Full documentation for the 1870 population census, including census forms and enumerator instructions, is available from the Integrated Public Use Microdata Series.

Population undercount 

Although Francis Walker, the Superintendent of the 1870 census, defended the quality of the census, arguing that standardized, clear, and statistical approaches and practices were carried out across all regions of the United States, the public at the time was disappointed in the national growth rate and suspected underenumeration. With especially bitter complaints coming from New York and Philadelphia claiming up to a third of the population was not counted, the President made the rare move to order a recount in those areas. While it was thought a large fraction of the population was not counted for being indoors in the wintry cold, newer estimates resulted in only a 2.5% increase in Philadelphia's population and a 2% increase in New York's.

This controversy of the 1870 undercount resurfaced in 1890, when the national growth rate between 1880 and 1890 was discovered to be much lower than it was between 1870 and 1880. Critics then asserted that the 1870 population must have been underenumerated by over 1.2 million people to account for the discrepancy between growth rates; it was presumed that the growth rate in 1880 had to be exaggerated because of the 1870 undercount.  Despite the fact that modern investigations have yet to quantify the exact effect of the undercount, most modern social scientists do not believe the undercount was as severe as 1890 investigators assumed. Today most analyzers compare the 1870 undercount to the non-response rates seen in most modern census data.

State and territory populations

Notes

Town populations (sorted by population)

References 

 
 
 
  
 

United States Census, 1870
United States census
United States